The Warlord Game is a 1977 board game published by Robert Williams Games.

Gameplay
The Warlord Game is a fantasy role-playing board game about gaining power in medieval Europe.

Reception
David James Ritchie reviewed The Warlord Game in The Space Gamer No. 16. Ritchie commented that "As history of even the flavor-of-the-era variety, it is something of a bust; as a role-playing vehicle, it is tremendous."

Don Turnbull reviewed The Warlord Game for White Dwarf #7, and stated that "This is quite an attractive game and could be fun with 4 players or more, though rather dull with two."

Reviews
The Guide to simulations/games for education and training

References

Board games introduced in 1977